Bagdadia khaoensis is a moth in the family Gelechiidae. It was described by Kyu-Tek Park and Margarita Gennadievna Ponomarenko in 1999. It is found in Thailand and Hainan, China.

The length of the forewings is 8-9.5 mm. The ground colour of the forewings, as well as the markings are identical to those of Bagdadia salicicola. The hindwings are grey.

The larvae feed on Dimocarpus longan.

References

Moths described in 1999
Bagdadia